Filecoin (⨎) is an open-source, public cryptocurrency and digital payment system intended to be a blockchain-based cooperative digital storage and data retrieval method. It is made by Protocol Labs and shares some ideas from InterPlanetary File System allowing users to rent unused hard drive space. A blockchain mechanism is used to register the deals. Filecoin is an open protocol and backed by a blockchain that records commitments made by the network’s participants, with transactions made using FIL, the blockchain's native currency. The blockchain is based on both proof-of-replication and proof-of-spacetime.

History 
The project was launched in August 2017, and raised over $200 million within 30 minutes.

Philanthropy 
In April 2021, the Filecoin Foundation donated 50,000 filecoins worth $10,000,000 to the Internet Archive. In addition, Internet Archive's founder Brewster Kahle and director of partnerships Wendy Hanamura joined the boards of advisors of Filecoin and  the Filecoin Foundation for the Decentralized Web.

Network total storage power 
As of January 2023, the total storage capacity was 18.8 EiB, and total data stored was 495 PiB.

See also 
Distributed data store

References

External links 

 

2017 software
Cloud applications
Cryptocurrency projects
Data synchronization
Distributed data storage
File hosting for Windows
Peer-to-peer computing